Mystery Mountain may refer to:

Mystery Mountain (serial), a 1934 Western film serial
JumpStart Adventures 3rd Grade: Mystery Mountain, a 1996 educational computer game created by Knowledge Adventure
"Mystery Mountain", a song from the band Journey's self-titled debut album Journey